The Asian Skating Union (ASU) is the Asian governing body for competitive ice skating disciplines, including figure skating, synchronized skating, speed skating, and short track speed skating. It is now based in Seoul, South Korea.

ASU Championships
 Asian Speed Skating Championships
 Asian Figure Skating Trophy
 Asian Short Track Speed Skating Trophy

References

External links
 Olympic Council of Asia

International Skating Union
Sports governing bodies in Asia
National governing bodies for ice skating